Laxdale Hall is a 1953 British romantic comedy film directed by John Eldridge and starring Ronald Squire, Kathleen Ryan, Raymond Huntley and Sebastian Shaw, with Prunella Scales and Fulton Mackay in early roles. Released in the U.S. as Scotch on the Rocks, it was adapted from the 1951 novel Laxdale Hall by Eric Linklater.

The story is one of the few to touch on the British Town Planning system – mocking the New Towns Act 1946.

Plot

The few car owners of Laxdale, a remote village near the Isle of Skye at Applecross, refuse to pay their Road Fund taxes, in protest against the poor state of the only road. A series of summonses, sent out via the local police, mysteriously 'disappear'. The government sends a delegation to investigate. It is led by Samuel Pettigrew, a pompous politician and industrialist, whose Mother was born in Laxdale. He is accompanied by another MP, Hugh Marvell, and Andrew Flett from the Scottish Office.

Pettigrew presents plans to abandon the village and set up a New Town, Brumley Dumps, 100 miles away. But the villagers are highly unimpressed.

Flett (Fulton Mackay), a former teacher, begins romancing the local schoolteacher (Prunella Scales). Marvell spends his time with the daughter of the Laird, a retired General.

The villagers see everything differently. In the middle of torrential rain, the local poacher chats casually with the undertaker saying "och, there's a bit of mist on the hill". The hearse is used to transport his poached stag. Later, in the pouring rain, they hold an open air production of MacBeth. The play is abandoned when news arrives that there are poachers from Glasgow on the estate (local poachers are tolerated). They ambush the poachers and the police arrest them.

By the time the delegation is ready to leave, Pettigrew has accepted the viewpoint of the villagers; they must have a new road.

Production

The external scenes were shot in Applecross and "Laxdale Hall" is in fact Applecross House, an early 18th century laird's house of formal composition.

Cast
 Ronald Squire as General Matheson
 Kathleen Ryan as Catriona Matheson
 Raymond Huntley as Samuel Pettigrew, M.P.
 Sebastian Shaw as Hugh Marvell, M.P.
 Fulton Mackay as Andrew Flett of the Scottish Office
 Jean Colin as Lucy Pettigrew
 Jameson Clark as Roderick McLeod the local poacher
 Grace Gavin as Mrs. McLeod
 Keith Faulkner as Peter McLeod
 Prunella Scales as Morag McLeod
 Kynaston Reeves as Reverend Ian Macaulay
 Andrew Keir as McKellaig
 Nell Ballantyne as Nurse Connachy
 Roddy McMillan as Willie John Watt
 Rikki Fulton as First Poacher
 Eric Woodburn as Gamlie, leader of the Poachers
 Archie Duncan as Police Sergeant at Kyle of Lochalsh
 Ian MacNaughton as Police Constable
 Howard Connell as the postman

Critical reception
The Radio Times wrote, "The huge success of director Alexander Mackendrick's Whisky Galore! meant it was inevitable that film-makers would cast around for more stories of wily Scots running rings around the stiff-necked English. However, lightning didn't strike twice and this tale of the battle between Whitehall and a tiny Hebridean island, whose inhabitants won't pay a hated road tax, lacks the magic sparkle of Mackendrick's classic"; whereas TV Guide wrote, "The humor is subtle and gentle, but often very funny, in much the same way as that in Bill Forsyth's pictures (Local Hero, Comfort and Joy) three
decades later."

References

External links

1953 films
1953 romantic comedy films
British romantic comedy films
Films set in London
Films set in Scotland
British black-and-white films
Films directed by John Eldridge
1950s English-language films
1950s British films